The Return of the Riddle Rider is a 1927 American silent Western film serial directed by Robert F. Hill. It is a sequel to The Riddle Rider (1924) which also starred William Desmond in the lead role. The film is considered to be lost.

Cast
 William Desmond as Randolph Parker / The Riddle Rider
 Lola Todd as Madge McCormack
 Grace Cunard as Vilda Dixon
 Tom London as Buck White
 Henry A. Barrows as Senator McCormack
 Scotty Mattraw as Willie
 Lewis Dayton as James Thornley
 Norbert A. Myles as James Archer
 Howard Davies as Hank Wilson

See also
 List of film serials
 List of film serials by studio

References

External links
 

1927 films
1927 lost films
1927 Western (genre) films
American silent serial films
American black-and-white films
Films directed by Robert F. Hill
Lost Western (genre) films
Lost American films
Universal Pictures film serials
Silent American Western (genre) films
1920s American films